College of the City of New York may refer to:

 City University of New York (CUNY), the public university system of New York City
 College of the City of New York, an old name (1866–1929) for City College of New York, now part of CUNY
 New York City College of Technology, CUNY's technology college, founded in 1946
 University of the City of New York, old name for New York University, a private research university founded in 1831

See also
 University of New York (disambiguation)